is a subway station on the Fukuoka City Subway Hakozaki Line in Fukuoka, Japan.

The station's name, which is the longest for a Japan subway station, means "Front of Kyushu University Hospital in Maidashi". Chiyo-Kenchōguchi Station is, however, closer to the hospital. Maidashi-kyūdai byōin mae is the station closest to the Prefectural Government office. The symbol on the sign is a dove, representing peace and nursing (a reference to the nearby hospital).

Station layout
The station consists of one island platform located in the second basement, serving two tracks.

History
The station opened on 27 April 1984 as a terminus of the subway line.

Surrounding area
 Fukuoka Prefectural Government Office
 Fukuoka Prefectural Police Headquarters
 Hakata Revenue Office
 Kyushu University (medical school, dental School, school of medicine, attached to hospital)
 Hakata girls' high school and junior high school
 Fukuoka city Maidashi elementary school
 Nagatsuka-bushi song memorial
 Higashi Park
 Maidashi ryokuchi

References

External links

 Fukuoka City Subway Maidashi-Kyūdaibyōinmae Station information 

Railway stations in Fukuoka Prefecture
Hakozaki Line
Railway stations in Japan opened in 1984